The Moto Guzzi Le Mans is a sports motorcycle first manufactured in 1976 by Italian company Moto Guzzi. It was named after the 24-hour motorcycle endurance race at Le Mans in France. The Le Mans designation was first used for an 850 prototype, based on the V7, displayed at Premio Varrone in late 1972.

The original 850 Le Mans was a café racer with clip-on handlebars and a bikini nose fairing, but in the face of more and more powerful bikes from other manufacturers later models were developed more as sports tourers with a three-quarter fairing. A marketing success, the Le Mans competed against Italian superbikes from Ducati and Laverda. The original Le Mans was continually developed and spawned several later models, a final versions appearing in the early 1990s.

Design
The basic design of the Le Mans remained essentially the same throughout the production run:

Engine
The engine developed from the earlier Moto Guzzi 750s is an aircooled 90 degree OHV V-Twin was at the time an already proven Moto Guzzi design that had been in production in various forms since the late 1960's. Like previous models the engine is mounted longitudinally in the chassis (Crankshaft inline with the wheels) presenting the air cooled cylinders to direct uninterrupted airflow and allowing a direct powertrain to the rear wheel. The V-twin configuration gives improved ground clearance over an opposed 'Boxer' layout, allowing the engine to mounted low in the chassis. The single camshaft mounted in the crux of the V operates the 2 valves (per cylinders) via pushrods and is driven by a short double row camchain. The camchain mounted on the front of the engine also drives the oil pump for wet sump lubrication.

Transmission
The 5 speed gearbox is directly bolted to the rear of the engine and does not share oil with the engine. The gearbox is driven from the dry multiplate clutch with two friction plates. The Output shaft drives the double row universal joint and drive to the rear wheel is via a crown and pinion bevel box with its own oil supply.

Chassis
Like the engine the chassis was developed from the Moto Guzzi 750s. Designed by Lino Tonti for the Moto Guzzi V7 Sport, the substantial chassis was made from straight tubing, highly triangulated and was praised at the time for its excellent handing.

850 Le Mans

The Le Mans 850 or Le Mans Mark I (never officially labelled Mark I), was first shown at the Milan motorcycle show in November 1975, and sales began in 1976. Like the 750S and the 750 S3, the Le Mans 850 was developed from the 53 hp V7 Sport model of 1971,

 but power was increased to 71 hp. The power output measured at the back wheel was 71 bhp, giving a top speed of 130 mph. Compared to its roadster sibling, the T3, the Le Mans had higher-compression domed pistons, larger engine valves, and Dell'Orto 36 mm pumper carbs with filterless velocity stacks.  Now commonly called the 'Mid Valve' engine, Moto Guzzi claimed 73HP/53.7Kw at 7700 RPM.

The Le Mans had three production runs with very slight modifications:

The first run, Series A, had a round CEV taillight, low 'racer' seat that was unusually a made of a single molded foam item, silver fork legs and various minor detail changes and continued in production until at least September 1976,. Although it is often stated that fewer than 2,000 of these were made, Ian Falloon claims 219 were made in 1975 and a further 2,532 in 1976 although it is possible some of these were Series B bikes built at the end of the year.

The Series B run totaled some 4,000 (2,548 in 1977, 1,737 in 1978). Falloon gives total 850 Le Mans production as 7,036. Series B bikes and had these modifications: a De Tomaso-designed rectangular taillight with a modified rear mudguard, black fork sliders, small heel-plates, cast fuel taps and a more generous dual seat.

Series C bikes gained ridges on the heel-plates. Most bikes were red and black, but a few were metallic blue (Ice Blue), and even fewer were white.

Le Mans bikes exported to the United States had yellow side reflectors on CEV indicators, and a sealed-beam headlight as the OEM Aprilia headlight did not meet Department of Transportation approval. These US sealed-beam units protruded in an ungainly way, spoiling the profile of the bike.

The bike was not without its faults, the single piece seat quickly cracked and broke. Many cycle parts including the upswept exhaust were flat black and paint was not up to the task, the bikes quickly gained a reputation for rusting of the black painted components.

Reviews in the motorcycle press where mixed.  Most disliked the molded seat and switchgear but praised the willing engine and handling. The high gearing gave a relaxed cruising speed and made deceptive progress. In 1977 Cycle Magazine said "the only shaft drive motorcycle to handle really well when ridden hard". The model would go on to be an iconic model for Moto Guzzi and the quintessential sporting Moto Guzzi.

850 Le Mans II

The Mark II was similar to the Mark I, but the small 'bikini" fairing became a larger full fairing, in three parts, incorporating indicators. The fairing had been tested in Moto Guzzi's wind tunnel (which had been used to test race bike fairings in the 1950s). The new fairing had a rectangular headlight, rather than the earlier round item. later bikes saw an oil sump spacer to increase internal volume and move the oil away from the crankshaft and cylinder bores were updated to alloy coated with Moto Guzzi's patented "Nigusil".

The front forks were slightly changed and now held slightly wider in the yokes (triple trees). The seat was the same as the Le Mans and could comfortably carry a pillion. Further changes included a revised instrument cluster derived from the 1000cc SP. Brakes were linked, with the handlebar lever operating the front right caliper and the footbrake operating both the front left and rear caliper via a simple splitter.

CX 100

For the US market whose importer had always wanted a larger displacement machine than the 850 Lemans II. The mid valve 850 engine was replaced with the engine from the 1000 SP1000 to make the CX 100. Outwardly similar to the 850 Le Mans Mk II, despite the larger capacity of the touring engine, it produced less power, but with stronger bottom and mid range power making for an arguably more 'usable' street machine. The Le Mans MK II was not available in the US.

850 Le Mans III

In 1981 a major redesign saw the tank, seat, fairings updated, which now resembled the V50 Monza and V35 Imola models. The instrument cluster was now dominated by a large white faced Veglia tachometer inside a moulded rubber binnacle. An extensive technical re-design saw many changes from the Mk II model. The engine saw considerable updates with revised cylinder head and barrels, with a squared-off cooling-fin design. The sump spacer was now standard and the breather box was now replaced with condenser that used the upper frame rail. The pushrods and cylinder studs were moved further from the bore centre, allowing for the future increases in cylinder capacity. The engine had improved machining tolerances, revised intake, carburation and exhaust systems all of which gave an increase in power and torque despite the (official) slight drop in compression ratio.

Minor changes were made to the rear suspension, with a longer swinging arm and to the front forks which were now up to 38mm, and had a provision for linked air-assistance. A true proportioning valve was fitted to the linked brakes, improving the braking performance and later models had revised cast wheels although still with tube type tyres.

The Le Mans Mk III was well received by the press and the model sold well by Moto Guzzi standards and is held by some to be the best Le Mans model. A total of 9866 where built between 1981 and 1985 and where available in red, white and metallic grey. In 1983 Steve Attwood rode a Le Mans Mk III to victory in the US Iron Butt Rally covering 12458 miles in 11 days.

Le Mans 1000

Le Mans 1000  IV and V

The Le Mans 1000 appeared at the end of 1984 and continued with minor modifications until 1992. The two main production runs were known as Series 1 and Series 2 but more commonly called  the MK IV and MK V Le Mans. The Le Mans 1000 had an increased engine capacity of 949 cc, bigger vales and compression ratio of 10.2:1, with uprated 40 mm pumper carbs and the B10 camshaft from the original Le Mans race kit. Commonly known as the 'Big Valve' engine, Moto Guzzi claimed a (highly suspect) 81 hp / 59.1 kW) @ 7400 rpm.

For the Series 1 De Tomaso himself decreed a 16-inch front wheel and new Lario styling for the Le Mans 1000 both were initially unpopular with Guzzi traditionalists and the press reviewers  Instead of redesigning the frame to incorporate a smaller front wheel, for the first year of production Guzzi simply fitted the smaller wheel into the existing frame, which was designed for the 18-inch wheel. The wheels themselves were of a new design, the rear was up a size to 3.5 inch, able to take tubeless tyres and a longer swinging arm gave a lengthened wheelbase. Complaints about the 16-inch front wheel were answered by the following years 1985/86 versions, which had modified flatter topped steering yokes (triple trees) which reduced the trail and were made in steel rather than alloy. Later still longer front forks were used to keep the original geometry. Longer and stiffer 40mm forks were fitted, but the smaller 16-inch wheel necessitated fitting the smaller 270mm (270 mm) front disks, but were now semi-floating.

The new bike was now physically longer, higher and larger than the 850cc predecessors but had improved ergonomics and increased performance thanks to the more powerful engine.

An 18-inch front wheel option became available in 1987. The  bikes included uprated Bitubo dampers and updated geometry. When the 18-inch front wheel were fitted the longer forks for the 16-inch wheel now protruded through the yokes (triple trees). By 1988 most models were factory fitted with the 18-inch front wheel. A total of 4230 Le Mans MK IV's were made.

In 1988 the Series 2 also known as the Le Mans MK V again had some minor changes.  Gone for good was the disliked, but subsequently improved 16-inch front wheel, in favor of the 18-inch, like many manufactures the 16-inch wheels fell from fashion, although the smaller 270mm front disks if the smaller front wheel remained. The angular Lario styled handlebar fairing was replaced by a more rounded sleek subframe mounted fairing with external indicators. A total of 2113 Le Mans MK V's were made.

Le Mans 1000 SE (Special Edition)
Released to commemorate the 20th anniversary of the V7's appearance the 1000 SE was sold in late 1986, 1987, and also into 1988 for those in the US market. (Only 100 SE models were sold in the US.) All 1000 SE bikes were red and white, with a red seat, red cast wheels, black rocker covers, engine and lower rails, engines and transmissions. The gearing was closer and higher than the standard 1000.

Le Mans 1000 CI

The 1000 CI included some updates of the previous version and included a range of new two color paint schemes. The Series 3 is commonly called the Le Mans 1000 Mark V NT (new type) and was to be the final incarnation of the standard production line of Le Mans models. Near the end of production the half fairing was updated so it contained a dashboard mounted instruments rather than rubber binnacle upon the top yoke.

Ultima Edizione
By 1990 it was clear that the 'Big Valve' engine would soon not make the required emission standards, the oversized valves and heavily domed piston where long obsolete. 1992 saw the very last of the Le Mans models with the Ultima Edizone. These all black models numbered 1 to 100 came with a certificate and marked the end of the models 17 year production.

The basic chassis, running gear and engine would very briefly live on in the retro styled Moto Guzzi 1000s aping the style of the original 750S, the precursor to the original 850 Le Mans.

Land Speed Records

In 1999 a Series Le Mans Mk V took two land speed records in Nevada desert US.: the first, ridden by Todd Ross, was the 1000cc Production- Production Pushrod (P-PP) record at 134.441 mph for pushrod production motorcycles under 1000cc. The second, ridden by Mitch Freshour, was the 1000cc Special Construction Partial Streamliner-Pushrod Gas (APS-PG) at 142.271 mph.

Racing
In 1973 the Le Mans factory prototype finished 4th in the 24-hour race at Barcelona's Montjuïc circuit.

In 1977 Roy Armstrong won Britain's Avon Production Machine championship on a standard bike fitted with production race kit.

In 1984 Dr John Wittner campaigned and won a Le Mans MK III in the AMA/CCS US Endurance Series Championships.

In 1985 Dr John Wittner again returned with a Le Mans 1000 to win the AMA/CCS US Endurance Series Championships - Heavyweight Modified Class.

Preserved examples
Examples of all the Le Mans models are preserved in the Moto Guzzi Museum.

References

External links

Moto Guzzi Official website

Le Mans
Motorcycles introduced in 1976
Motorcycles powered by V engines
Shaft drive motorcycles
Sport bikes